The Steam Wheel Tank was a U.S.-produced, prototype armoured fighting vehicle built by the Holt Manufacturing Company (now Caterpillar Inc.). Developed sometime between late 1916 and early 1917, it was the third tank to be designed in the U.S. The prototype was completed in February 1918 and was evaluated between March and May 1918 at Aberdeen Proving Ground. It performed poorly and was not developed further.

Design
Although it is often assumed that the vehicle was a tadpole configuration (with two driving wheels at the front), a senior Holt executive and the Aberdeen Proving Ground's report state that it was a delta configuration (with the large wheels at the rear), and that the vehicle drove like a conventional agricultural tractor.

The rear wheels were made from pressed-steel sheet, the same as those used on Holt agricultural machinery of the period. A small plate was attached to the roller to assist in crossing trenches. Each rear wheel was driven by a Doble two-cylinder  steam engine and a Doble kerosene-fired boiler.

The vehicle's armament comprised 2 6-pounder (57 mm) cannons, mounted in sponsons, and two machine guns. Its riveted armour plating was between six and fifteen millimetres thick.

See also
 Steam powered tracked tank

References

Crismon, F.W. (1992) U.S. Military Tracked Vehicles. Motorbooks International
Automotive Historical Records: Volume III, Tanks and Combat Cars, (Automotive Division, Aberdeen Proving Ground, Maryland 1945)

External links

United States Heavy Tanks

World War I tanks of the United States
Abandoned military projects of the United States
History of the tank
Steam road vehicles
Trial and research tanks of the United States